The Vijay TV Award for Favorite Hero is given by STAR Vijay as part of its annual Vijay Awards ceremony for Tamil  (Kollywood)

Multiple Winners

Winners and nominations

 2006 Ajith Kumar Varalaru
 2007 Rajnikanth - Sivaji
Suriya - Vel
Vijay - Pokkiri
Ajith Kumar - Billa
Dhanush - Polladhavan
2008 Kamal Haasan - Dasavatharam
Ajith Kumar - Aegan
Suriya - Vaaranam Aayiram
Vijay - Kuruvi
Vikram - Bheema
2009 Vijay - Vettaikaran
Kamal Haasan - Unnaipol Oruvan
M. Sasikumar - Naadodigal 
Suriya - Aadhavan
Vikram - Kanthaswamy
2010 Rajinikanth - Enthiran
Ajith Kumar - Aasal
Vijay - Sura
Kamal Haasan - Manmadan Ambu
Suriya - Singam
2011 Ajith Kumar - Mankatha
Dhanush - Aadukalam
Suriya - 7aum Arivu
Vijay - Velayudham
Vikram - Deiva Thirumagal
2012 Vijay - Thuppakki
Ajith Kumar- Billa 2
Dhanush - 3
M. Sasikumar - Sundarapandian
Suriya - Maattrraan
2013 Vijay - Thalaivaa
Dhanush - Maryan
Suriya - Singam 2
Ajith Kumar - Arrambam
Kamal Haasan - Vishwaroopam
2014 Rajinikanth - Lingaa
Ajith Kumar - Veeram
Vijay - Kaththi
Dhanush - Velaiyilla Pattathari
Suriya - Anjaan

See also
 Tamil cinema
 Cinema of India

References

Favorite Hero